Lawrence Alfred North  (5 November 1903 – 21 October 1980) was a New Zealand Baptist minister and administrator. He was born in Ghum, India, on 5 November 1903.

In the 1971 Queen's Birthday Honours, North was appointed an Officer of the Order of the British Empire, for services as a minister of religion.

References

1903 births
1980 deaths
New Zealand Baptist ministers
New Zealand Officers of the Order of the British Empire
20th-century Baptist ministers